Mohammed Naseer Khan (1941  – 10 July 2006) was a Pakistani physicist and academic administrator, the former Rector of the Ghulam Ishaq Khan Institute of Engineering Sciences and Technology and Vice-Chancellor of Bahauddin Zakariya University. He also served as a special advisor to the government for education, Federal Minister, Grade MP-1.

Early life 
Khan was born in 1941 in Abbottabad, Pakistan. His family were local nobility and from the Jadoon tribe; his father was a police officer and his mother a homemaker.

Education and career 
In 1996, he took a position as the Dean of the Faculty of Engineering Sciences at the GIKI Institute in Topi, Pakistan, and later became the university's Prorector and then Rector. He also established a research laboratory on the ‘Fabrication and Characterisation of Advanced Materials’ in the Faculty of Engineering Sciences.

After serving as Rector of GIKI, Khan became the Vice-Chancellor of Bahauddin Zakariya University in May 2005. There "he endeavoured to create conducive work environment in the previously politicised and troubled institution and took unprecedented bold steps to achieve outstanding results."

Death 
Khan was killed on Pakistan International Airways Flight 688, which crashed in Multan on 10 July 2006, killing all 45 passengers and crew aboard. Following his death, The News International described him as one of the "most productive" scientists in Pakistan. A memorial service was also held in Bahrain.

Awards 

 Sitara-i-Imtiaz, awarded for services to education in the field of physics, 2002

References 

1941 births
2006 deaths
Pakistani physicists
Academic staff of Ghulam Ishaq Khan Institute of Engineering Sciences and Technology
Academic staff of Bahauddin Zakariya University
People from Abbottabad
Alumni of Brunel University London
University of Sindh alumni
Academic staff of King Fahd University of Petroleum and Minerals
Academic staff of the University of Bahrain
Recipients of Sitara-i-Imtiaz
Victims of aviation accidents or incidents in Pakistan
Victims of aviation accidents or incidents in 2006